Brighton and Hove Progressive Synagogue, also known as Adat Shalom Verei’ut (Congregation of Peace and Friendship), is a Liberal synagogue in Hove, Sussex, England. It was established in 1935 and now has more than 300 members. 

Elizabeth Tikvah Sarah (Rabbi Elli Sarah)  was appointed as Rabbi in 2000 and is now Rabbi Emeritus, having retired in 2021. Danny Rich, former chief executive of Liberal Judaism, was the interim Rabbi after her retirement; Gabriel Kanter-Webber took up the Rabbi post on a permanent basis from summer 2022. 

Services are held weekly on Friday evenings and Saturday mornings and also at the major Jewish festivals.

See also
 List of Jewish communities in the United Kingdom
 List of synagogues in the United Kingdom
 Liberal Judaism (United Kingdom)

References

External links
 Official website
 Brighton and Hove Progressive Synagogue on Jewish Communities and Records – UK (hosted by jewishgen.org)
 Brighton & Hove Online Jewish Community

1935 establishments in England
Hove
Jewish organizations established in 1935
Liberal synagogues in the United Kingdom
Synagogues in Brighton and Hove